The Telegram & Gazette (and Sunday Telegram) is the only daily newspaper of Worcester, Massachusetts. The paper, headquartered at 100 Front Street and known locally as the Telegram or the T & G, offers coverage of all of Worcester County, as well as surrounding areas of the western suburbs of Boston, Western Massachusetts, and several towns in Windham County in northeastern Connecticut.

The ownership corporation, Worcester Telegram & Gazette Corp., was a wholly owned subsidiary of The New York Times Company (publisher of The New York Times and The Boston Globe) from 2000 to 2013.  In 2013, the New York Times Company sold both the T & G and the Globe to John W. Henry, owner of the Boston Red Sox, although Henry told staff at the Worcester paper he intended to sell it as soon as possible. In 2014, Henry sold the paper to Halifax Media Group. In 2015, Halifax was acquired by New Media Investment Group.

History 
On January 22, 1913, the Worcester Telegram ran a story ("Thorpe with Professional Baseball Team Says Clancy"), soon picked up by other papers, that led to Jim Thorpe being stripped of his 1912 Olympic titles, medals and awards.

Until the 1980s, two papers—the Worcester Telegram in the morning and the Evening Gazette in the afternoon—were published by the same company, with separate editorial staffs in some departments. The two were merged into a single Telegram & Gazette upon their acquisition by Chronicle Publishing Company, publishers of the San Francisco Chronicle, in 1986. The Chronicle sold the Telegram & Gazette to The New York Times Company in 1999.

The paper's previous owners also owned Worcester radio station WTAG until selling it after the newspapers were divested, in 1987.

In 2018, owner GateHouse Media acquired Holden Landmark Corporation, owner of the alternative weekly Worcester Magazine.

Circulation

 1999: 107,400
 2012: 74,563 (weekday)
 2018: 22,400 (weekday)

Sections and features 

The weekday Telegram & Gazette contains national, state and local news, as well as sports, business, and a feature stories. On Thursdays Worcester Magazine is inserted in the paper highlighting local artists and events in the area. 

The paper's regular reporters also contribute regular or occasional columns with names such as "Barnestorming", "City Hall Notebook", "Politics and the City", etc. The local news section also includes local news stories and obituaries.

All editorials and letters to the editor appear in the regional opinion and op-ed pages of the main news section.

The Sunday Telegram includes the county's largest classified ad listings, Business Matters section, News, Local and Editorial pages, Living and Homes, and Cars sections, a tabloid-sized comic section and an in-house created Arts, Culture and Travel Section, which replaced similar sections that used to be reprinted in full from The Boston Globe.

The Worcester Telegram & Gazette Corporation owns Coulter Press, which publishes several weekly newspapers in suburban towns northeast and east of Worcester. The Telegram staff also produces Worcester Living (formerly Worcester Quarterly), a local lifestyle magazine. Before their sale to Community Newspaper Company in 1993, the T&G also owned the Hudson Sun and Marlboro Enterprise daily newspapers and Beacon Communications Corporation weekly newspapers in western Middlesex County, Massachusetts.

References

Further reading

External links

 

Newspapers published in Massachusetts
The New York Times
Mass media in Worcester, Massachusetts
Gannett publications